Paradise was a small town in Muhlenberg County, Kentucky, United States. It was once a trading post along the Green River. The area was strip mined in the 20th century, and what was left of the town was bought-up and torn down in 1967 by the Tennessee Valley Authority due to health concerns related to its proximity to a nearby coal-burning electric plant, Paradise Fossil Plant.

History
Paradise was settled in the early nineteenth century when it was known as Stom's Landing, for Leonard Stom who founded the ferry there. It may have once been named Monterey. The origin of its final name of Paradise is not known. It is postulated the name was descriptive, for settlers who considered the setting to be paradise. A post office was established at Paradise on March 1, 1852; it closed in March 1967. Though the town did endure numerous floods of the Green River during its lifespan, it survived.

In 1959, the TVA built a coal plant at the former site of Paradise. The coal-fired plants remain controversial and the Paradise permits in particular, have been criticized by environmentalists for non-compliance with the Clean Air Act. Since construction of new scrubbers on Unit 3 at Paradise, the plant's emissions from the massive unit have dropped dramatically in recent years; this in turn has led to a dramatic drop in toxic emissions from the plant overall.

John Prine
A song about Paradise, Kentucky, called "Paradise", was written and made famous by singer/songwriter John Prine. The lyrics attribute the destruction of Paradise to the Peabody company, referring to the fact that the town was a site for strip mining. The town continued to exist in partial form after the Pittsburg & Midway Coal Company and Peabody Coal Company stripped the coal around it. The Paradise Fossil Plant was initially erected with only two units; afterwards, the residents who were left in the village were bought out by the Tennessee Valley Authority after ash fall from the newly opened plant brought health concerns to the area. Soon after the TVA bought the town out, they tore down all the structures and constructed the largest cyclonic fired boiler in the world at the new "Paradise Unit 3". All that remains of the original town is a small cemetery at the top of a hill close to the plant.

Numerous cover versions of the song have been recorded.

Geography
Paradise was situated on the eastern edge of Muhlenburg County along the Green River. Kentucky Route 176 is the only major thoroughfare on and out of the area, leading west to the towns of Drakesboro and Greenville. Prior to the early 1960s, KY 176 also traveled eastward across the Green River into Ohio County to connect the area to Rockport.

References

External links
 Ancestors of Robert Stom & Christine (Hilton) Stom
 Photos of old Paradise
A pictorial trip to John Prine's Paradise KY - links up old photos of the town to each line of the lyrics
An up-to-date picture of the TVA Paradise Fossil Plant- This plant is the second largest coal-fired plant in the Tennessee Valley Authority (TVA), rated at 2,558 megawatts at Winter Peak.

Ghost towns in Kentucky
Geography of Muhlenberg County, Kentucky
Populated places disestablished in 1967
1967 disestablishments in Kentucky
Peabody Energy